Jean Preuss (10 July 1904 – 14 September 1986) was a French racing cyclist. He rode in the 1929 Tour de France.

References

1904 births
1986 deaths
French male cyclists
Place of birth missing